Independence Airport  is a public airport located one mile (1.6 km) north of Independence, serving Inyo County, California, United States. It has two runways and is mostly used for general aviation.

Facilities 
Independence Airport has two runways:
 Runway 14/32: 3,722 x 60 ft (1,134 x 18 m), surface: asphalt
 Runway 05/23: 1,610 x 30 ft (491 x 9 m), surface: dirt

History 
During World War II, the airport was used by the United States Army Air Forces as an auxiliary training airfield for the flying school at Lone Pine Airport, California.

See also

 California World War II Army Airfields

References 

 Airport Master Record (FAA Form 5010), also available as a printable form (PDF)

External links

Airports in Inyo County, California
Airfields of the United States Army Air Forces in California